Arvingarna is a Swedish dansband formed in Gothenburg in 1989. The group consists of Casper Janebrink (vocals and bass guitar), Lars Larsson (guitars, vocals and keyboards), Kim Carlsson (vocals and guitars) and Tommy Carlsson (drums and vocals). At Melodifestivalen 1993, they performed the song '"Eloise", which won, allowing Arvingarna to represent Sweden in the Eurovision Song Contest in Millstreet Co.Cork in May that year, where the song finished 7th.

History 

Arvingarna was founded in 1989, following the members earlier having played heavy metal, without any major successes. The band's name ("The heirs") refers to the group member's parents, who also were active in dansbands. Arvingarna plays a form of dansband music that is it inspired by pop music and rock music, and has also being described as a boyband.

The band has competed in the Swedish Melodifestivalen in 1993, 1995, 1999,  2002, 2019 and 2021.

In 2019 they participated in Melodifestivalen 2019 with the song "I Do", where they placed 7th in the final scoring 64 points. The band returned two years later and participated in Melodifestivalen 2021 with the song "Tänker inte alls gå hem" taking part in the first heat on 6 February 2021 where they qualified directly for the finale. The finale was held on 13 March 2021 at the Annexet in Stockholm. Arvingarna finished 9th in the final with a total of 44 points.

Personnel 

 Casper Janebrink – vocals, bass (1989–present)
 Lars Larsson – guitars, vocals, keyboards (1989–present)
 Kim Carlsson – vocals, guitars (1989–present)
 Tommy Carlsson – drums, vocals (1989–present)

Discography

Albums

Compilation albums

Singles

Notes

Citations

External links 

 
 

Melodifestivalen winners
Musical groups established in 1989
Musical groups from Gothenburg
Eurovision Song Contest entrants for Sweden
Eurovision Song Contest entrants of 1993
Dansbands
1989 establishments in Sweden
Sibling musical groups
Melodifestivalen contestants of 2021
Melodifestivalen contestants of 2019
Melodifestivalen contestants of 2002
Melodifestivalen contestants of 1999
Melodifestivalen contestants of 1995
Melodifestivalen contestants of 1993